(born 1934), is a former Grand Prix motorcycle road racer from Japan. Hasegawa began his Grand Prix career in 1963 with Yamaha. He enjoyed his best season in 1966 when he finished the season in tenth place in the 250cc world championship. Hasegawa won the Macau Grand Prix in 1967 and 1968.

References 

Japanese motorcycle racers
250cc World Championship riders
1934 births
Living people